This is a list of notable restaurants in London, United Kingdom.

Restaurants in London

Current

Defunct

See also

 List of companies based in London
 List of Michelin starred restaurants
 List of three Michelin starred restaurants in the United Kingdom
 List of pubs in London
 Lists of restaurants
 Restaurants in London (category)

References

External links
 
 Top Historical Restaurants in London at Cityon.uk

Restaurants
London
 
Restaurants